William Lowell Jr. (December 19, 1897 – May 13, 1976) was a manufacturer of golf tees at Reddy Tee Company and an industrial packaging specialist.

Biography
He was the son of William Lowell Sr. and was married to Katherine Macpherson. He took over his father's company. His father started the Reddy Tee Company and patented a wooden tee for golf. The company was sold to Red Devil, Inc. in 1933. He then moved to Union Bag Company where he worked on developing the six pack carton.

He retired in 1961 and had been living in Fanwood, New Jersey and died at Muhlenberg Regional Medical Center in Plainfield, New Jersey in 1976.

References

1897 births
1976 deaths
Red Devil, Inc.
People from Fanwood, New Jersey